Tropidophorus micropus  is a species of skink found in Indonesia and Malaysia.

References

micropus
Reptiles of Indonesia
Reptiles described in 1905
Taxa named by Theodorus Willem van Lidth de Jeude